Potmess Rocks is a group of large rocks lying northwest of Robert Island in the South Shetland Islands, Antarctica.  The group is extending , featuring the conspicuous rocks named Asses Ears in the north.  The area was visited by early 19th century sealers operating from nearby Clothier Harbour.

The feature's name derived from the midday stew served on the launch Nimrod during the Royal Navy hydrographic survey of the rocks in 1967.

Location

See also
 List of Antarctic and sub-Antarctic islands
 South Shetland Islands

Maps
 Chart of South Shetland including Coronation Island, &c. from the exploration of the sloop Dove in the years 1821 and 1822 by George Powell Commander of the same. Scale ca. 1:200000. London: Laurie, 1822.
 L.L. Ivanov. Antarctica: Livingston Island and Greenwich, Robert, Snow and Smith Islands. Scale 1:120000 topographic map.  Troyan: Manfred Wörner Foundation, 2009.

References

External links
Composite Antarctic Gazetteer.

Rock formations of Robert Island
Islands of the South Shetland Islands